Mukhtar Abayomi Sanusi (born 28 April 2002) is a Nigerian professional footballer.

References

External links 
 
 
 Profile at Dinamo Brest website

2002 births
Living people
Nigerian footballers
Nigerian expatriate footballers
Expatriate footballers in Belarus
Association football forwards
FC Dynamo Brest players
Sportspeople from Abeokuta
21st-century Nigerian people